Hilmar Leon Jakobsen (born 2 August 1997) is a Faroese footballer who plays as a forward for HB and the Faroe Islands national team.

Career

Club 
Jakobsen has played football as well as handball, as a handball player he played for the Faroese club H71 and the national team. He played football as a young boy for HB Tórshavn for the U18 from 2013 to 2015 and for the U21 team in 2018, but due to injuries he chose to play handball instead of football. In June 2020 HB Tórshavn had several players who could not play because of injuries, so they asked Hilmar Leon Jakobsen if he could help them. He played at first in the second best division three matches, the first one was on 15 June 2020. On 4 July he played his first match for the first time in several years in the top tier. On 20 August the same year he played a match for HB Tórshavn in Europa League. Four months after his shift from handball to football and his first match for HB Tórshavn in the top tier for several years, he had his debut for the Faroe Islands national team.

International
Jakobsen made his international debut for the Faroe Islands on 11 November 2020 in a friendly match against Lithuania.

Career statistics

International

References

External links
 Hilmar Leon Jakobsen at FaroeSoccer.com
 
 

1997 births
Living people
Faroese footballers
Faroe Islands youth international footballers
Faroe Islands international footballers
Association football forwards
Havnar Bóltfelag players
Faroe Islands Premier League players